Linda Lopez may refer to:

Linda J. Lopez (born 1948), member of the Arizona Senate
Linda M. Lopez (born 1964), member of the New Mexico Senate
Linda Lopez (judge) (born 1968), attorney and jurist
Linda Nguyen Lopez (born 1981), American artist

See also
Lynda Lopez (born 1971), journalist